C'est pas sorcier (literally It's Not Sorcery, French for "it's not rocket science") was a popular French live-action, science education television program that originally aired from September 19, 1993, to February 1, 2014. In total, 559 episodes were produced. This program was popular culture, with an audience share of over 30% in France. The episodes continued to be rebroadcast, until at least 2021.
Dubbed or subtitled, the program is or has been broadcast in many countries, in Europe (Italy, Finland, Greece via Ellinikí Radiofonía Tileórasi, Poland via Da Vinci Learning, and Portugal), in Asia (Cambodia, China, South Korea, Japan, Laos, Lebanon, Mongolia, Turkey, and Vietnam), and in Africa (Morocco on the channel 2M, Tunisia via Tunisian television 2, and Algeria via Canal Algérie and Berbère Télévision).

In 2015, a new show, l'Esprit Sorcier hosted by Frédéric Courant began airing online, presenting itself as a successor to C'est pas sorcier.

The presenters 
In the show, "Sabine" (Sabine Quindou) and "Fred" (Frédéric Courant) work together in the field. They travel around the world, interviewing specialists, and asking questions to "Jamy" (Jamy Gourmaud) who, in his laboratory in the trailer of a truck driven by "Marcel", would answer them using his iconic models and mock-ups. After 2011, he travels to symbolic locations relevant to the topic with a mobile laboratory equipped with touch screens, computer graphics and the models which originally garnered the show much success.

The show is narrated by La petite voix ("The Little Voice", played by Valérie Guerlain) who does not appear physically in the show, but offers off-screen commentary and narration.

Topic 
The programs can be classified into six categories:

La Terre et l'Univers - (The earth and universe) (71 programmes)  including:  l'Espace et l'astronomie (space and astronomy) (18), la géologie (geology) (21), la géographie (geography), les découvertes (discovery) (32) 
La biodiversité, l'agronomie et l'environnement (biodiversity, agronomy and environment) (138) including la faune (fauna) (67), la botanique (botany) (14), l'alimentation  et l'agronomie (food and agriculture) (25), l'écologie et le climat (ecology and climate) (32) 
Le sport et la santé (sport and health) (72) including le corps humain (human body) (26), la médecine (medicine) (27), le sport (sport) (19)
Les technologies, la physique et la chimie (communication technology, physics and chemistry) (142) including physique et chimie (physics and chemistry) (13), énergie  (energy) (16), les technologies et l'industrie  (technology and industry) (23), les transports  (transport) (44), la Défense (defence) (10), les grands travaux et l'architecture (big works and architecture) (14), la communication (communications) (23)
L'histoire, la culture et la société (history, culture and society) (89) including l'histoire et l'archéologie (history and archeology) (44), Arts et spectacles (arts and shows) (18), économie et société (economy and society) (27)
Les émissions spéciales (14) (special editions)

References

External links
 Official Website on France 3 (in French)
 Official Website on TV5 (in French)
  (in French) official channel with full episodes.

1990s French television series
2000s French television series
2010s French television series
1993 French television series debuts
2014 French television series endings
Educational television series
France Télévisions original programming